The 2006 Tro-Bro Léon was the 23rd edition of the Tro-Bro Léon cycle race and was held on 16 April 2006. The race was won by Mark Renshaw.

General classification

References

2006
2006 in road cycling
2006 in French sport
April 2006 sports events in France